Pedro Filipe Antunes Matias Silva Franco (born 18 April 1974 in Lisbon) is a Portuguese former footballer who played as a central defender, currently a manager.

External links

1974 births
Living people
Portuguese footballers
Footballers from Lisbon
Association football defenders
Primeira Liga players
Liga Portugal 2 players
Segunda Divisão players
Odivelas F.C. players
C.D. Nacional players
Leça F.C. players
F.C. Maia players
C.F. União players
F.C. Penafiel players
Rio Ave F.C. players
Associação Naval 1º de Maio players
Vitória S.C. players
Moreirense F.C. players
AC Vila Meã players
K League 1 players
FC Seoul players
Portuguese expatriate footballers
Expatriate footballers in South Korea
Portuguese expatriate sportspeople in South Korea
Portuguese football managers